Cedar Rock may be:

Cedar Rock State Park
Cedar Rock Falls
Cedar Rock Creek
Cedar Rock, North Carolina
Cedar Rock Mountain